Philip Breno (born December 11, 1995) is an American soccer player who currently plays for the Tampa Bay Rowdies in the USL Championship.

Career
Breno began playing college soccer at the University of Maryland, Baltimore County in 2013, before transferring to the College of William & Mary in 2016 where he played for two further years.

During and immediately after college, Breno also appeared for National Premier Soccer League side FC Frederick between 2015 and 2018.

Charleston Battery
On March 8, 2019, Breno joined USL Championship side Charleston Battery. He made his professional debut on August 14, 2019, start in a 2–1 win over Loudoun United.

Forward Madison
On March 3, 2021, Breno signed with USL League One side Forward Madison FC.

Tampa Bay Rowdies (loan)
On July 12, 2022, Breno was loaned to the Tampa Bay Rowdies of the USL Championship for the remainder of the 2022 season. Rowdies goalkeeper Raiko Arozarena was loaned to Madison in the deal.

Tampa Bay Rowdies
Breno signed a permanent contract with the Rowdies on January 25, 2023.

References

1995 births
Living people
American soccer players
Association football goalkeepers
UMBC Retrievers men's soccer players
William & Mary Tribe men's soccer players
Charleston Battery players
Forward Madison FC players
Tampa Bay Rowdies players
Soccer players from Maryland
National Premier Soccer League players
USL Championship players
People from Mount Airy, Maryland